The 2011 Arab Cup U-17 was the first edition of the Arab Cup U-17, an association football tournament between Arabic countries.  It was played in July 2011 and hosted by Saudi Arabia.

Participants

Teams and Draw

The teams were drawn into the following groups:

{| class="wikitable" style="width:65%;"
|-
!width=25%|Group A
!width=25%|Group B
|-
|
 (host) 
 
 
 
|

Group stage

Group A

Group B

Knockout stage

Semi-finals

Third place playoff

Final

Winners

References

External links 
|www.uafaonline.com - UAFA official website

Arab Cup U-17
Arab Cup U-17
Arab Cup U-17
2011